"I'm the One" is a song by the American punk rock band the Descendents, released as the first single from their 1996 album Everything Sucks. The single also includes "Everything Sux" from the album and the B-side tracks "Lucky" and "Shattered Milo" from the album sessions.

The music video for "I'm the One" was directed by Dave Robinson. It depicts the band members visiting a sperm bank in order to make a sperm donation, and skateboarding down a street while wearing white costumes resembling sperm, interspersed with black-and-white footage of the band performing the song in concert. Singer Milo Aukerman later remarked that the concept was Robinson's: "He kinda took the idea of 'I'm the One' to mean 'I'm gonna be your sperm, baby.' When he told me the idea I thought, 'Oh no, shades of Woody Allen!', but when I got on that skateboard in that sperm costume, I don't know, things just started to work for me. Don't forget, we spend a lot of our time being incredibly stupid and silly."

Track listing

Personnel 

Band
Milo Aukerman – vocals
Stephen Egerton – guitar, producer, engineer
Karl Alvarez – bass guitar
Bill Stevenson – drums, producer, engineer

Additional musicians
Chad Price – backing vocals

Production
Jason Livermore – additional engineering
Andy Wallace – mix engineer
Steve Sisco – assistant mix engineer
Howie Weinberg – mastering
Grey Stool – cover illustration

References 

1997 singles
Descendents songs
1996 songs
Epitaph Records singles